The calceus (pl. calcei: cf Latin calx "ankle") was a mid-weight, outdoor walking "shoe-boot", worn in ancient Rome. It was flat-soled, usually hobnailed and entirely covered the foot and ankle, up to the lower shin. It was secured with crossed thongs or laces. 

Lighter than the openwork caligae favoured by the Roman military, calcei were considered a distinctive part of Rome's public, civilian "national dress", which centered on the toga as an exclusive mark of Roman male citizenship. The calcei of most ordinary citizens were probably a natural brown tanned leather. The equestrian class had its own distinctive form of calceus, with crescent-shaped buckles. Male citizens of senatorial rank and office, including certain priesthoods, were expected to wear a red-bordered toga praetexta and red calcei (s. mulleus calceus) when engaged in their public duties. 

The combination of toga and calcei was impressive, but also hot and uncomfortable; the Roman poet Martial claims that in their leisure time, and more relaxed surroundings of rural life, hardly anyone used it. Even in the city, some high-ranking citizens wore light, Greek-style sandals, rather than calcei, to "go with the crowd".

See also
Discalced
Clothing in ancient Rome
Soccus
Solea
 Caligae

References

Roman-era clothing
Historical footwear